Xu Feihong (born May 1964) is a Chinese diplomat. He served as the Chinese Ambassador to Afghanistan from 2011 to 2013 and Chinese Ambassador to Romania from 2015 to 2019.

References

Ambassadors of China to Afghanistan
Ambassadors of China to Romania
1964 births
Living people